SAS Norge may refer to:

 Norwegian Air Lines changed its name to SAS Norge in 1996
 SAS Braathens was briefly known as SAS Norge
 Scandinavian Airlines previously had a division known as SAS Norge